Incheon Subway Line 2 is a 27 station subway line  from Oryu-dong in Seo-gu to Incheon Grand Park., part of the Incheon Subway system. The line is also included as a part of the overall Seoul Metropolitan Subway network; Juan station has a free transfer with Seoul Subway Line 1, Geomam station connects with the AREX Line to Incheon International Airport and Seoul Station, and Seongnam also has a free transfer with Seoul Subway Line 7.

Line 2 has aboveground sections north of Asiad Stadium and east of Namdong-gu Office.

History
 June 26, 2009: Construction begins. The price of building the line was 2 trillion KRW. 
 Early 2016: Trial runs begin.
 July 30, 2016: The line opens, after seven years of construction.

Line 2 was planned to open in August 2014, but the opening date was pushed back to July 30, 2016.

Rolling stock and signaling
The ITC Line2 is a driverless, fully automatic subway system. The line uses 37 two-car trains, all of which were built in 2013 by Hyundai Rotem, a member of Hyundai Motor Group. They are similar to the Canada Line cars in Vancouver, Canada.

Currently, all stations are long enough to fit four-car trains (two sets mated together); however, current operations use two-car trains (one set per train).

SelTrac CBTC is currently being implemented on the line by Thales, along with an urban rail traffic management system; these systems will allow the trains to be driverless.

Stations

See also
 Incheon Transit Corporation
 Incheon Subway
 List of metro systems
 Seoul Metropolitan Subway
 Transportation in South Korea

External links 

 Incheon Subway at UrbanRail.net
 Incheon Subway Line 2 Webpage(Korean)

References

 
Seoul Metropolitan Subway lines
Subway Line 1
Railway lines opened in 2016
Light rail in South Korea
750 V DC railway electrification